Boğazkaya is a village in the Mecitözü District of Çorum Province in Turkey. Its population is 102 (2022).

References

Villages in Mecitözü District